The strada statale 70 "della Consuma" (SS 70) was an Italian state road, created in 1928 and disestablished in 2000. It began in Pontassieve and ended in Bibbiena, in the Tuscany region.

History 
The road was created in 1928 with the following route: "Junction with the state road nr. 69 in Pontassieve – Passo della Consuma – Junction with the state road n. 71 in Bibbiena." The road was called "della Consuma", from the name of a pass in the Apennine Mountains.

In 1998 the government decided to devolve to the Regions all the state roads that were not considered of "national importance". The list of those roads, compiled in 2000, defined the state road nr. 70 of "regional interest", and therefore it was devolved to the Tuscany region.

References

External links 

70
Transport in Tuscany
1928 establishments in Italy
2000 disestablishments in Italy